Dragomirna may refer to the following places in Romania:

Dragomirna Monastery, a monastery in Suceava County
Dragomirna, a village in the commune Mitocu Dragomirnei, Suceava County
Dragomirna (Suceava), a tributary of the Suceava in Suceava County
Dragomira, a tributary of the Șușița in Vrancea County

See also 
Drăgan (disambiguation)